Étienne Maurice Falconet (1 December 1716 – 24 January 1791) was a French baroque, rococo and neoclassical sculptor, best-known for his equestrian statue of Peter the Great, the Bronze Horseman (1782), in St. Petersburg, Russia, and for the small statues he produced in series for the Royal Sévres Porcelain Manufactory

Life

Falconet was born to a poor family in Paris. He was at first apprenticed to a carpenter, but some of his clay figures, with the making of which he occupied his leisure hours, attracted the notice of the sculptor Jean-Baptiste Lemoyne, who made him his pupil. One of his most successful early sculptures was of Milo of Croton, which secured his admission to the membership of the Académie des beaux-arts in 1754.

He came to prominent public attention in the Salons of 1755 and 1757 with his marbles of L'Amour and the Nymphe descendant au bain (also called The Bather), which is now at the Louvre. In 1757 Falconet was appointed director of the sculpture atelier of the new Manufacture royale de porcelaine at Sèvres, where he brought new life to the manufacture of small sculptures in unglazed soft-paste porcelain figurines that had been a specialty at the predecessor of the Sèvres manufactory, Vincennes.

The influence of the painter François Boucher and of contemporary theater and ballet are equally in evidence in Falconet's subjects, and his sweet, elegantly erotic, somewhat coy manner. Right at the start, Falconet created for Sèvres a set of white biscuit table garnitures of putti (Falconet's Enfants), illustrating the Arts, meant to complement the manufacture's grand dinner services. The fashion for similar small table sculptures spread to most of the porcelain manufacturies of Europe.

He remained at the Sèvres post until he was invited to Russia by Catherine the Great in September 1766. At St Petersburg he executed a colossal statue of Peter the Great in bronze, known as the Bronze Horseman, together with his pupil and stepdaughter Marie-Anne Collot. In 1788, back in Paris he became director of the Académie des beaux-arts. Many of Falconet's religious works, commissioned for churches, were destroyed at the time of the French Revolution. His work on private commission fared better.

He found time to study Greek and Latin, and also wrote several brochures on art: Denis Diderot confided to him the chapter on "Sculpture" in the Encyclopédie, separately released by Falconet as Réflexions sur la sculpture in 1768. Three years later, he published Observations sur la statue de Marc-Aurèle, which may be interpreted as the artistic program for his statue of Peter the Great. Falconet's writings on art, his Oeuvres littéraires came to six volumes when they were first published, at Lausanne, in 1781–1782.

Falconet's somewhat prettified and too easy charm incurred the criticism of the Encyclopædia Britannica Eleventh Edition:
"His artistic productions are characterized by the same defects as his writings, for though manifesting considerable cleverness and some power of imagination, they display in many cases a false and fantastic taste, the result, most probably, of an excessive striving after originality."

In 2001/2002, when the Musée de Céramique at Sèvres mounted an exhibition of Falconet's production for Sèvres, 1757–1766, its subtitle was " l'art de plaire" ("the art of pleasing.")

Family
The painter Pierre-Étienne Falconet was his son.

Notes

External links

1716 births
1791 deaths
18th-century French sculptors
French male sculptors
Russian male sculptors
Rococo sculptors
Artists from Paris
Members of the Académie des beaux-arts
Contributors to the Encyclopédie (1751–1772)
French male non-fiction writers
18th-century French male writers
18th-century sculptors from the Russian Empire
18th-century French male artists